The Lost Coaster of Superstition Mountain is a wooden roller coaster at Indiana Beach in Monticello, Indiana, themed to that of a mine shaft. It was the last coaster Custom Coasters International (CCI) finished (they had also started work on New Mexico Rattler at Cliff's Amusement Park but went bankrupt before they could finish it). The ride is unusual as it has an elevator to raise the cars to the top of the track as opposed to the more traditional lift-hill. CCI constructed new cage-enclosed cars due to the proximity between riders and the themed 'mountain' sections of the ride. Eight people may ride in a two-car train simultaneously. Two face forward and two backward, opposite each other in each car.

The ride enters an enclosed 'mountain' area several times throughout the ride. The imitation mountain was originally used for a previous dark ride. This dark ride went through the mountain and lights would illuminate scenes of various animals in the mountain.

The Lost Coaster is a moderate ride and does not have big drops. Part of the thrill is the alarming shake generated by the unusual track design.

The ride itself has been open since the mid-1980s as a mine like car ride with no hills or wooden tracks. The original ride's opening was delayed for a long time before officially opening in the 1980s.

Lost Coaster was designed to operate three, eight-passenger trains, but most of the time runs only one or two, which can result in long waiting times.

The Lost Coaster is also known for getting stuck quite often due to design flaws in the track. The train requires more weight in the front car to trigger sensors in the “Dynamite Willie” section of the ride, otherwise the car will get stuck in the break run.

The Gravity Group, which is run by the former CCI designers, stated that Lost Coaster was the inspiration for the design of Twister at Gröna Lund in Sweden.

Layout

Station 
Riders start by boarding the train in one of two cars, either facing forwards or backwards. The ride operator then dispatches the train, which makes a right hand turn into a Trim brake, before entering the elevator lift. the train is stopped by a brake, and the elevator starts to ascend the 35 ft (11 m) elevator shaft. While in the elevator, a skeleton animatronic gives one of three pre recorded spiels.

Floor 3 
Once at the top, the brake releases, sending the train out of the elevator and into a sharp turnaround that sends riders flying into the side of the car. The train then briefly enters the mountain, making a left hand turn and quickly exiting again. The car goes through a couple airtime hills before flying around an inner banked turnaround that will also send riders out of their seats. The car then flies through a couple of anti-rollbacks, and up into the mountain. The car makes a sharp right-hand turn and then a sharp left-hand turn, before transitioning slowly into a turnaround that leads to the mid-course brake run.

during the midcourse, the train comes to a complete stop, and a short show scene plays in which a character dubbed 'Dynamite Willie' yells "Fire in the hole!" and pushes down a detonator, setting off fake explosions and sending the train off. Sometimes, the car will be going too slow, and will not make it far enough to trigger a proximity sensor, thus stopping the ride.

Floor 2 
After the midcourse, the train falls into a double-down and then into a sharp right-hand turn, momentarily bringing riders outside the mountain, before going right back in. The train then rolls up into a couple show scenes of an abandoned mineshaft, and then a bear that came from the original Superstition Mountain Mine Ride. The train then rolls through a couple unbanked right and left turns, before slowly making a left-hand turn, and exiting the mountain once again, passing next to the 'Antique Autos' ride, before making another left-hand turn and plunging back into the mountain.

Floor 1 
The car passes through a circular tunnel left from the old Mine Ride, before hitting a magnet brake that slows the train down so it can make a very sharp inner-banked turnaround. The car then passes through a scene where fake rocks are falling because of a fake earthquake. The train then makes one last turnaround into a scene where there is a fake train that the car is heading towards. The train blows its whistle and the car makes a sharp left turn just before hitting the locomotive.

Final Brake Run 
The train then goes into a set of traction tires that push the train up into a left-hand turn and one more set of traction tires, that push the train up into the final brake run. The train then waits there until the next train is dispatched or the station is open. Riders then exit the train and the ride is over.

History

Construction 
Superstition Mountain operated at Indiana Beach from 1984 to 2001. Plagued with electrical issues due to the electrical track not being able to operate in the rain, Tom Spackman Jr. (the park's previous owner) decided he wanted to turn the ride into a rollercoaster. He turned to CCI, which built both of Indiana Beach's previous Wooden Rollercoasters, to take on the task of turning the old dark ride into a coaster. During the 2001 offseason, Indiana Beach employees began disassembling the old ride, and got it ready for CCI. The coaster features some of the craziest and tightest turns a rollercoaster had ever seen, some having a radius of less than 6 feet. To accommodate these turns, CCI also had to build a proprietary new train for the ride. Originally, the cars did not have any kind of cage around them, but it was determined that cages were needed to protect guests from potential harm. On Friday, May 17, 2002, the new coaster was announced at a media event. The coaster officially opened on June 6, 2002.

2002 Offseason 
In the offseason of 2002, the ride was updated to include more features and upgrades, such as new animatronics, props, and even plumbing for a waterfall. The top of the mountain was also finished, adding one more floor to increase its height.

References

 1. A-Z Coaster of the Week: Lost Coaster of Superstition Mountain. Coaster101.com
 "Lost Coaster Of Superstition Mountain". COASTER-net.com
 Rides: Indiana Beach. Indianabeach.com

Roller coasters in Indiana
Enclosed roller coasters
Roller coasters introduced in 2002
2002 establishments in Indiana